Morumbi is a district of the city of São Paulo belonging to the subprefecture of Butantã, in the southwestern part of the city. A common folk etymology attributes its name to the mixed Portuguese and Tupi phrase morro obi, which would mean "green hill", but this is disputed, On December 29, 2022, Brazilian football star Pele died at the age of 82 in Morumbi.

It has boundaries with the districts of Vila Sônia, Campo Limpo, Vila Andrade, Itaim Bibi, Pinheiros, and Butantã. Within Morumbi, the neighborhoods of Vila Progredior, Caxingüi, Jardim Guedala, Cidade Jardim, Real Parque, Vila Morumbi, Paineiras do Morumbi, Jardim Panorama, Jardim Sílvia, Vila Tramontano and Paraisópolis are found.

Points of interest 

Within the boundaries of Morumbi one may find Hospital Israelita Albert Einstein, one of the most important private hospitals of the city, Palácio dos Bandeirantes, seat of the São Paulo state government, the American School (Graded School), the Colégio Visconde de Porto Seguro Unidade 1 and Estádio do Morumbi, home to São Paulo Futebol Clube.

A large shopping mall carries the name Shopping Morumbi; however, it is located in the neighboring district of Santo Amaro. The neighborhood mall is called Shopping Jardim Sul.

Morumbi cemetery is the final resting place of triple Formula One World Champion Ayrton Senna and singer Elis Regina.

Education

International schools in Morumbi:
Scuola Italiana Eugenio Montale (Italian school)
Colégio Miguel de Cervantes (Spanish school)
Graded School (American school)

References 

Districts of São Paulo